Dishonorable Discharge is a French-Italian film starring Eddie Constantine as the American Captain Burt Brickford. The captain lives incognito on an island in Middle America since he has been accused of causing an accident and didn't trust the military court.

Synopsis 
Burt Brickford gets engaged as captain for a fun trip. Brickford hesitates to accept the job offer because the ship will be heading for Cuba. He is even more suspicious when his employer named Henery Legrand can provide him with a new passport. Yet Brickford is in desperate need of a new job and a new passport and so he can't decline.

When they are on sea, Brickford discovers a great deal of dynamite in Legrand's ship. He confronts Legrand who now admits to be a treasure hunter. Brickford takes him to the place where the treasure is supposed to be.

While Legrand's divers are looking in vain for a treasure, pirates attack the ship. They are led by a drug dealer named Paulo who intends to use the ship for smuggling drugs into the United States. Even so, there is no way Brickford would comply with that.

Cast 
Eddie Constantine as Captain Burt Brickford
Pascale Roberts as Constance Are
Lino Ventura as Paolo
Véronique Zuber as Marina Legrand
Robert Berri as Perez
Lise Bourdin as Claire
Jean Murat as Henery Legrand
Jacques Castelot as Gérard Lester
Christian Morin as Jacques
Jacques Seiler as Bath
René Havard as the helmsman

External links 

1957 films
French comedy films
Italian comedy films
Films directed by Bernard Borderie
Films set in the Caribbean
Seafaring films
Treasure hunt films
1950s French films
1950s Italian films